Whispers of the Dead is the third novel in the Dr David Hunter series, created by Simon Beckett. It was published in January 2009 by Bantam Press.

Plot
Dr David Hunter returns to 'The Body Farm' in Tennessee where he learned the ins and outs of forensic anthropology. He has gone to America to try and see if he can still do the job he has become accustomed to after surviving the attempt on his life by Grace Strachan, the murderess from the previous book, Written in Bone.

Whilst in Tennessee, a body is found in a remote cabin in the woods and David's old instructor asks him to tag along for a fresh pair of eyes at the crime scene. A fingerprint at the crime scene leads them to a man who had died six months earlier and whose own body has been replaced in his grave by that of someone far older than he was. It becomes clear that they are dealing with someone who has the same intricate and detailed forensic knowledge that they have and that a serial killer is on the loose.

References

Dr David Hunter (series)
Novels set in Tennessee
2009 British novels
Bantam Press books